Hill is a hamlet in the civil parish of Leamington Hastings and the borough of Rugby, in Warwickshire, England. The hamlet is between Leamington Hastings and the A426 road from Rugby to Southam.

External links 

Hamlets in Warwickshire